? is the second studio album by American rapper and singer XXXTentacion and his last studio album to be released before his murder. It was released on March 16, 2018, by Bad Vibes Forever, Caroline Distribution, and Capitol Music Group. It succeeds the release of his debut studio album 17 (2017) and the extended play A Ghetto Christmas Carol (2017). The album was primarily produced by frequent collaborator John Cunningham, and includes guest appearances from PnB Rock, Travis Barker, Joey Badass, Matt Ox, Rio Santana, Judah, and Carlos Andrez.

Featuring more live instrumentation than 17, ? features an array of genres, including acoustic, emo, alternative rock, trap, and cloud rap. XXXTentacion's vocals on parts the album are less restrained and lo-fi-ish compared to 17, with his vocals on introspective songs over piano and acoustic guitar chords being more projected. On other parts of the album, XXXTentacion's style resembles his underground sound, with him screaming. 
The album was supported by three singles: "Sad!", "Changes", and "Moonlight". Following XXXTentacion's death on June 18, 2018, "Sad!" topped the Billboard Hot 100, where XXXTentacion became the first act to earn a posthumous Hot 100 number-one single as a lead artist since The Notorious B.I.G. with "Mo Money Mo Problems" in 1997.

? received positive reviews from critics, and became XXXTentacion's first US number-one album, debuting at number one on the Billboard 200 with 131,000 album-equivalent units earned in its first week. The album has since been certified triple platinum by the Recording Industry Association of America (RIAA). On Spotify, it is the most-streamed rap album of all-time. At the 2019 Billboard Music Awards, ? was nominated for Top Billboard 200 Album, among other nominations. An anniversary deluxe edition of the album was originally going to be released on July 26, 2019, but was pushed back to September 6, 2019, featuring the album's instrumentals, A Ghetto Christmas Carol, voice memos from the recording sessions of the album, and new material featuring American rapper Rico Nasty and Japanese video game composer Yoko Shimomura.

Background
XXXTentacion released his debut studio album, 17 in August 2017 to commercial success. Following the release of the album, he announced he was quitting music due to negativity and backlash, though he eventually signed a $6 million one-album deal with Caroline Distribution and released A Ghetto Christmas Carol EP on his SoundCloud on December 11, 2017.

After the release of A Ghetto Christmas Carol, XXXTentacion announced he was preparing three new albums and eventually announced the titles of the albums as Bad Vibes Forever, Skins, and ?, after being released on house arrest on December 23, 2017. The track listing and release date was confirmed by XXXTentacion on March 12, 2018, via social media.

Composition
A contrast to 17, the album features an array of genres, including alternative rock, emo, trap, acoustic, and cloud rap. The song "I Don't Even Speak Spanish LOL" has been labelled as reggaeton pop, while "Infinity (888)" is a classic hip hop song. XXXTentacion's vocals on parts the album are less restrained and lo-fi-ish compared to 17, with his vocals over piano and acoustic guitar chords being more projected. On other parts of the album, XXXTentacion's style resembles his underground sound pre-"Look at Me", with him portraying anger through screaming.

Promotion
The cover art was first shown on XXXTentacion's Instagram story on January 28, 2018, with the caption "coming soon". Later that day, he explained that:"This albums not about the words, it's about the feeling...it'll be very hard to understand, but very easy to listen to...it's not what you're expecting, even if you feel like you understand my music, be prepared to not understand this music."XXXTentacion released the song "Hope" on his SoundCloud on February 21, 2018, dedicated to the survivors of the Stoneman Douglas High School shooting. XXXTentacion later hosted a benefit show for the survivors on March 18, 2018, and offered condolences to the victims of the shooting. On February 25, 2018, after the release of "Hope", the rapper posted vague messages on social media accusing Canadian rapper Drake of threatening to murder him alongside crude photoshopped images of Drake. XXXTentacion proceeded to claim his accounts were hacked whilst there was speculation he was insulting the rapper for promotion of "Sad!" and "Changes".

Singles
The lead singles "Sad!" and "Changes" were released March 2, 2018, for streaming and digital download. "Sad!" debuted at number 17, and peaked at number one on the Billboard Hot 100, becoming XXXTentacion's first number-one song and his highest-charting single to date. XXXTentacion became the first act to earn a posthumous Hot 100 number-one single as a lead artist since The Notorious B.I.G. with "Mo Money Mo Problems" in 1997. "Changes" debuted at number 47 on the week beginning March 13, 2018, and peaked at number 18. The album's third single "Moonlight" was released posthumously to rhythmic radio on August 14, 2018. "Moonlight" peaked at 13 on the Billboard Hot 100 after XXXTentacion's murder.

The Rico Nasty remix of "#ProudCatOwner" was released in August 2019 as a promotional single for the album's deluxe edition.

Critical reception

In a positive review, online publication HotNewHipHop stated that "Despite a sagging middle section, ? features some of X's most nuanced and impressive material to date", adding that "X's commitment to honoring his various influences is admirable, but it may have behooved him to spend a little bit more time on sequencing this artistic kaleidoscope." XXL gave the album a positive review, and wrote "The album sonically goes every which way—a double-edge sword that can make for a dizzying, disjointed listen at times. Still, ? is X's most stimulating offering to date and with a little more focus on structure and cohesion, X's best work could very well be ahead of him."  Sputnikmusic gave a negative review, saying that "This exercise in granting credence to emotionally stunted, bad musicians is something that is truly stunning to bear witness to." 

At the 2019 Billboard Music Awards, ? was nominated for Top Billboard 200 Album, among other nominations.

Commercial performance
? debuted at number one on the US Billboard 200 with 131,000 album-equivalent units, with 20,000 pure album sales. It was XXXTentacion's only US number-one album during his lifetime. The album was certified platinum by the Recording Industry Association of America (RIAA) on August 7, 2018 and was later certified quadruple platinum in 2022.

? also reached number one in Canada, the Czech Republic, Denmark, New Zealand, Norway, and Sweden. Following XXXTentacion's death, the album reached a new peak of number one in the Netherlands. It also ascended the Billboard 200 from number twenty-four to three, earning 94,000 units. As well as the United States, the album has been certified platinum in Canada, France, Italy, Sweden, and triple platinum in Denmark.

An anniversary deluxe edition of the album was originally going to be released on July 26, 2019, but was pushed back to September 6, 2019, featuring the album's instrumentals, the EP A Ghetto Christmas Carol (2017), voice memos from the recording sessions of the album, and new material featuring American rapper Rico Nasty and Japanese video game composer Yoko Shimomura.

Track listing
Credits adapted from Tidal, YouTube Music and iTunes.

Notes
  signifies a co-producer
 "Changes" features uncredited vocals by PnB Rock.
 "#ProudCatOwnerRemix" is a remix of the 2017 track "#ProudCatOwner #IHateRappers #IEatPussy"

Stylizations
 "Introduction (Instructions)" is stylized as "introduction (instructions)".
 "Alone, Part 3", "Sad!", "Numb", "Smash!", and "#ProudCatOwnerRemix" are stylized in uppercase letters. For example, "Sad!" is stylized as "SAD!".
 "The Remedy for a Broken Heart (Why Am I So in Love)", "I Don't Even Speak Spanish LOL", and "Before I Close My Eyes" are stylized in lowercase letters, except for the word I.
 "Infinity (888)", "Going Down!", "Love Yourself", "Changes" and "Schizophenia" are stylized in lowercase letters. For example, "Infinity (888)" is stylized as "infinity (888)".
 "Pain = Best Friend" is stylized as "Pain = BESTFRIEND".
 "Jah on Drums" is stylized in sentence case.

Personnel
Credits adapted from Tidal and YouTube Music.

Performers
 XXXTentacion – vocals
 Joey Badass – vocals 
 Travis Barker – drums 
 Matt Ox – vocals 
 PnB Rock – vocals 
 Rio Santana – vocals 
 Judah – featured artist 
 Carlos Andrez – featured artist 
 Yoko Shimomura – piano 
 Rico Nasty – featured artist 

Musicians
 XXXTentacion – guitar , piano 
 John Cunningham – guitar , piano , drums , keyboards , bass guitar , strings 
 Robert Soukiasyan – drums , guitar 
 Travis Barker – drums  
 Adolfo Mercado – drums 
 Yoko Shimomura – piano 

Technical
 Dave Kutch – mastering 
 Robert Soukiasyan – recording , mixing 
 Kevin Peterson – mastering assistant , mastering 
 John Cunningham – mixing , recording 
 John Crawford – recording 
 Jahseh Onfroy – recording , mixing 
 Koen Heldens – mixing 
 Chris Quock – recording assistant 
 Matt Malpass – recording 
 Z3N – recording , mixing 
 Karl Wingate – recording assistant 

Production
 XXXTentacion – production 
 John Cunningham – production 
 Robert Soukiasyan – production , co-production 
 PnB Rock - co-production 
 Dell Soda – production 
 P. Soul – production 
 TM88 – production 
 Tre Pounds – production 
 Den Beats – production 
 Laron Wages – production 
 Smash David – production 
 Rekless – production 
 Z3N – production

Charts

Weekly charts

Year-end charts

Decade-end charts

Certifications

Release history

References

2018 albums
XXXTentacion albums
Albums produced by TM88
Alternative R&B albums
Alternative rock albums by American artists